The minister of Crown–Indigenous relations is a minister of the Crown in the Canadian Cabinet, one of two ministers (the other being the minister of northern affairs) who administer Crown-Indigenous Relations and Northern Affairs Canada (CIRNAC), the department of the Government of Canada which is responsible for administering the Indian Act and other legislation dealing with "Indians and lands reserved for the Indians" under subsection 91(24) of the Constitution Act, 1867. The minister is also more broadly responsible for overall relations between the federal government and First Nations, Métis, and Inuit.

Marc Miller has been the present minister of Crown–Indigenous relations since October 26, 2021.

The current version of the position was created alongside the minister of Indigenous services, who administers Indigenous Services Canada, the department responsible for health care, water, and other services to Indigenous communities when Prime Minister Justin Trudeau announced on August 28, 2017, that the federal government intended to abolish the Indigenous and Northern Affairs Canada department.

Legal title
The applied title of the Department of Indian Affairs and Northern Development (DIAND), under the Federal Identity Program, is Indigenous and Northern Affairs Canada (INAC). INAC is responsible for policies relating to Aboriginal peoples in Canada, that comprise the First Nations, Inuit and Métis. The title has been changed over the last decade from "Minister of Indian Affairs and Northern Development" to a working title of "Minister of Aboriginal Affairs and Northern Development Canada" on May 18, 2011, during the cabinet shuffle under then-Prime Minister Stephen Harper, and again to "Minister of Indigenous and Northern Affairs Canada" during the 29th Canadian Ministry on November 4, 2015. The current working title under CIRNAC was introduced in the 29th Ministry on August 28, 2017, in which Prime Minister Justin Trudeau announced that the Indigenous and Northern Affairs Canada would be gradually abolished.

Mandate
According to their website, the mandate of the Crown-Indigenous Relations and Northern Affairs Canada (CIRNAC) is to "renew the nation-to-nation, Inuit-Crown, government-to-government relationship between Canada and First Nations, Inuit and Métis; modernize Government of Canada structures to enable Indigenous peoples to build capacity and support their vision of self-determination; and lead the Government of Canada's work in the North."

Nomenclature
In their July 5, 2018 document, CIRNAC wrote that the concept of Aboriginal nation in Canada, based on the 1996 Report of the Royal Commission on Aboriginal Peoples (RCAP), refers to "a sizeable body of Aboriginal people with a shared sense of national identity that constitutes the predominant population in a certain territory or collection of territories. There are three elements in this definition: collective sense of identity; size as a measure of capacity; and territorial predominance. The first element, a collective sense of identity, can be based on a variety of factors. It is usually grounded in a common heritage, which comprises such elements as a common history, language, culture, traditions, political consciousness, laws, governmental structures, spirituality, ancestry, homeland or adherence to a particular treaty."

According to the 1985 Department of Indian Affairs and Northern Development Act (R.S.C., 1985, c. I-6)  the term "Indian" remained in the department's legal name, although the term "Indigenous" is used in its applied title under the Federal Identity Program.

According to a 2004 AADNC Government of Canada document, the term "First Nation", has been used since the 1970s instead of the word "Indian", which some people found offensive. The term "Indian" is used for legal and historical documents such as Status Indians as defined by the Indian Act. For example, the term "Indian" continues to be used in the historical and legal document, the Canadian Constitution and federal statutes. The term "Aboriginal" is commonly used when referring to the three groups of Indigenous peoples as a whole, First Nations, Inuit and Métis. It is also used by Aboriginal people who live within Canada who claim rights of sovereignty or Aboriginal title to lands.

Background
In 1983, the Penner Report by the Special Parliamentary Committee on Indian Self-Government, chaired by Liberal MP Keith Penner, had recommended the phasing out of the Indian Act and the Department of Indian Affairs and the introduction of Native self-government. Then-Prime Minister Brian Mulroney, had dismissed the report in 1984. Reports and commissions following the Penner Report including the "Report on the Royal Commission on Aboriginal Peoples (1996), the Truth and Reconciliation Commission of Canada Calls to Action (2015), the Principles Respecting the Government of Canada’s Relationship with Indigenous Peoples (2017), Recognition of Indigenous Rights and Self-Determination discussions, and the national engagement—[Recognition and Implementation of Indigenous Rights Framework (RIIRF)]—led by the Minister of Crown-Indigenous Relations", confirmed that "changes are needed to ensure that policies effectively respond to the needs and interests of Indigenous communities" and that policies need to be aligned "with evolving laws and the United Nations Declaration on the Rights of Indigenous Peoples, including the concept of free, prior and informed consent." On February 14, 2018, during a speech in the House of Commons, Trudeau announced the formation of the Recognition and Implementation of Indigenous Rights Framework which was intended to "enshrine Section 35 of the Constitution Act, 1982— which affirms Indigenous rights — in federal law" and to "fill the gap between federal government policies and multiple court decisions on Indigenous rights." It was to be undertaken in "full partnership with First Nations, Inuit, and Métis Peoples".

In their Fourteenth Report released on December 3, 2018, the Standing Senate Committee on Aboriginal Peoples listed improvements, changes and concerns related to the relationship between CIRNAC and agencies such as the Lands Advisory Board also known as First Nations Land Management Resource Centre (FNLMRC), the First Nations Tax Commission (FNTC) and the First Nations Financial Management Board

Changing names and responsibilities from 1867 to 2019
Prior to Canadian Confederation in 1867, the Indian Department for British North America was responsible for relations between the Crown and Indigenous peoples.

A superintendent-general of Indian affairs was in the Cabinet of Canada from 1867 until 1936 when the Minister of Mines and Resources became responsible for native affairs. In 1950, the Indian Affairs branch was transferred to the minister of citizenship and immigration, who had responsibility for "status Indians" until the creation of the position of minister of Indian affairs and northern development in 1966.

Before 1966, the Northern Development portions of the portfolio were the responsibility of the minister of northern affairs and national resources.

A 1983 House of Commons Committee recommended that Indian or First Nations communities be allowed to write their own membership code provided that the code did not violate fundamental human rights. A second report from the 1983 Penner Committee recommended the gradual abolition of the office of minister of Indian affairs and a transfer of responsibility for their own affairs to First Nations communities. Proposed changes died on the House of Commons' Order Paper at the end of the parliamentary session and have not been re-introduced.

Until amendments to the Indian Act in 1985 restored Indian status to many people whose status had been revoked for discriminatory reasons, about half of the persons claiming to be Indians were entitled to be registered as Indians under the Indian Act and to receive the benefits reserved for registered Indians under the Act. In 1985, status was restored to 100,000 people including women who married men who were not Status Indians, and their children; people who had, prior to 1961, renounced their Indian status so they could vote in federal elections, and their children; people whose mother and paternal grandmother did not have status before marriage (these people lost status at 21), and their children; and people who had been born out of wedlock of mothers with status and fathers without, and their children.

As of July 2004, the minister of Indian affairs and northern development has been assigned the role of federal interlocutor for Métis and Non-Status Indians concurrently.

By 2017, CIRNAC and the minister of Indigenous services were responsible for federal government relations with First Nations, Inuit and Métis.

Acts
The Minister has responsibilities, wholly or partially, under a number of Acts:(list may not be complete)
Arctic Waters Pollution Prevention Act R.S., 1985, c. A-12
British Columbia Indian Cut-off Lands Settlement Act — 1984, c. 2
British Columbia Indian Reserves Mineral Resources Act — 1943–44, c. 19
British Columbia Treaty Commission Act — 1995, c. 45
Canada Petroleum Resources Act — R.S., 1985, c. 36 (2nd Supp.)
Canada-Yukon Oil and Gas Accord Implementation Act — 1998, c. 5
Canadian Polar Commission Act — 1991, c. 6
Caughnawaga Indian Reserve Act — 1934, c. 29
Claim Settlements (Alberta and Saskatchewan)Implementation Act — 2002, c-3
Condominium Ordinance Validation Act— 1985, c. 46
Cree-Naskapi (of Quebec) Act — 1984, c. 18
Department of Indian Affairs and Northern Development Act — R.S., 1985, c. I-6
Dominion Water Power Act, — R.S., 1985, c. W-4
First Nations Commercial and Industrial Development Act — 2005, c. 53
First Nations Jurisdiction over Education in British Columbia Act — 2006, c. 10
First Nations Land Management Act — 1999, c. 24
First Nations Oil and Gas and Moneys Management Act — 2005, c. 48
Fort Nelson Indian Reserve Minerals Revenue Sharing Act — 1980-81-82-83, c. 38
Grassy Narrows and Islington Indian Bands Mercury Pollution Claims Settlement Act — 1986, c. 23
Gwich’in Land Claim Settlement Act — 1992, c. 53
Indian Act — R.S., 1985, c. I-5
Indian Lands Agreement Act (1986) — 1988, c. 39
Indian Oil and Gas Act — R.S., 1985, c. I-7
Kanesatake Interim Land Base Governance Act — 2001, c. 8
Kelowna Accord Implementation Act 2008, c. 23
Labrador Inuit Land Claims Agreement Act — 2005, c. 27
Lands Surveys Act, Canada — R.S., 1985, c. L-6 Part III
Mackenzie Valley Resource Management Act — 1998, c. 25
Manitoba Claim Settlements Implementation Act — 2000, c. 33
Mi’kmaq Education Act — 1998, c. 24
 Natural Resources Transfer (School Lands) Amendments, (Alberta, Manitoba and Saskatchewan) (see also School Lands) — 1960–61, c. 62
Nelson House First Nation Flooded Land Act — 1997, c. 29
New Brunswick Indian Reserves Agreement — 1959, c. 47
Northwest Territories Act — R.S., 1985, c. N-27
Northwest Territories Waters Act — 1992, c. 39
Nova Scotia Indian Reserves Agreement — 1959, c. 50
Nunavik Inuit Land Claims Agreement Act — 2008, c. 2
Nunavut Act — 1993, c. 28
Nunavut Land Claims Agreement Act — 1993, c. 29
Nunavut Waters and Nunavut Surface Rights Tribunal Act — 2002, c. 10
 Oil and Gas Operations Act, Canada — R.S., 1985, c. O-7
 Pictou Landing Indian Band Agreement Act — 1995, c. 4
 Sahtu Dene and Metis Land Claim Settlement Act — 1994, c. 27
 St. Peters Indian Reserve Act — 1916, c. 24
 St. Regis Islands Act — 1926–27, c. 37
 Saskatchewan Treaty Land Entitlement Act — 1993, c. 11
 Sechelt Indian Band Self-Government Act — 1986, c. 27
 Songhees Indian Reserve Act — 1911, c. 24
 Specific Claims Tribunal Act 2008, c. 22
 Split Lake Cree First Nation Flooded Land Act — 1994, c. 42
 Territorial Lands Act — R.S., 1985, c. T-7
 Tlicho Land Claims and Self-Government Act — 2005, c. 1
 Tsawwassen First Nation Final Agreement Act — 2008, c. 32
 Westbank First Nation Self-Government Act — 2004, c. 17
 Western Arctic (Inuvialuit) Claims Settlement Act — 1984, c. 24
 York Factory First Nation Flooded Land Act — 1997, c. 28
 Yukon Act — 2002, c. 7
 Yukon Environmental and Socioeconomic Assessment Act — 2003, c. 7
 Yukon First Nations Self-Government Act — 1994, c. 35

Boards, Commissions and Other Responsibilities
The Minister is also the lead Minister or responsible Minister for:
Canadian Polar Commission
Corporation for the Mitigation of Mackenzie Gas Project Impacts
First Nations Statistical Institute
Indian Oil and Gas Canada
Northwest Territories Commissioner
Northwest Territories Water Board
Mackenzie Valley Environmental Impact Review Board
Contract for Implementation of the Nunavut Land Claims Agreement
Nunavut Commissioner
Nunavut Impact Review Board
Nunavut Planning Commission
Nunavut Water Board
Yukon Territory Commissioner

List of ministers

Prior to 1966, responsibilities for the Indian Affairs portion of this portfolio fell under the Minister of Citizenship and Immigration (List), and the Northern Development portion under the Minister of Northern Affairs and National Resources (List).

See also
Recognition and Implementation of Indigenous Rights Framework
 Minister of Indigenous Services
List of Canadian Ministers of Mines and Resources (1936–1950)
 Indian and Northern Affairs Canada
Indian Register
Indian Agent (Canada)
Indian Department, for historical background
Royal Commission on Aboriginal Peoples
Congress of Aboriginal Peoples
The Canadian Crown and First Nations, Inuit and Métis

Aboriginal peoples in Canada
First Nations
Inuit
Métis people (Canada)
Minister for Families, Community Services and Indigenous Affairs (Australia)

Notes

References

External links
 Individuals Responsible for Aboriginal and Northern Affairs in Canada 1755 to 2006
The Nunavut Project

Indigenous peoples in Canada
Crown-Indigenous Relations and Northern Affairs